Chowgam is a village in Kulgam district, having its block in Qazigund of Anantnag district. It is one of the oldest villages in Kashmir Valley. It's among the highly pada-likha villages of valley. Villages that depend on it are Churat, Sopat, Bonigam and many other minor villages.

Geography
Chowgam is located at the south-western part of Kashmir as well as Anantnag district. Two main Rivers flow from this village:
 River Lamer, arising from the southern Mountain surrounding this village.
 River Wyeth, arising from the kund Spring and joining Lamer at the end of the Village.
These two rivers make one unit and join the Jehlum river and continue their journey.
Paddy fields are located near the Boundary of the village.

Religion
People mostly follow Islam. There is a shrine of Baba Naseeb Din Gazi who was from Iraq. 
Once there were Kashmiri Pandits but migrated to other places during the insurgency in the late 1980s and continued till the 1990s, still there are some Hindu families residing who never left even after the insurgency.

Occupation
Majority of people here are government employees. Mostly teachers and professors in government buildings.
Agriculture also plays an important role in the lives of some farmers. Minority of people work in shops, hotels and road transport.

Education
This village alone has a number of schools and higher schools but no college.  Some of the famous schools are:
 Hanfia Public High School Chowgam
 New Age MODEL Institute
 Govt. Higher Secondary School
 Girls Middle School
 PS ASTANPORA
 MS BONGAM
 MS BAGANDHAR

References

Villages in Kulgam district